Joseph S. Calabretta (February 19, 1917 – June 10, 1993) was an American politician who served in the New York State Assembly from 1968 to 1973.

He died of a stroke on June 10, 1993, in Manhasset, New York at age 76.

References

1917 births
1993 deaths
Democratic Party members of the New York State Assembly
20th-century American politicians